Mid Wales ( or simply Y Canolbarth, meaning "the midlands") or Central Wales refers to a region of Wales, encompassing its midlands, in-between North Wales and South Wales. The Mid Wales Regional Committee of the Senedd covered the unitary authority areas of Ceredigion and Powys and the area of Gwynedd that had previously been the district of Meirionnydd. A similar definition is used by the BBC. The Wales Spatial Plan defines a region known as "Central Wales" which covers Ceredigion and Powys.

Mid Wales is dominated by the Cambrian Mountains, including the Green Desert of Wales. The region is sparsely populated, with an economy dependent on farming and small businesses.

Major settlements

 Aberaeron
 Aberdyfi
 Aberporth
 Aberystwyth
 Bala
 Barmouth
 Borth
 Brecon
 Builth Wells
 Caersws
 Cardigan
 Crickhowell
 Dolgellau
 Fairbourne
 Harlech
 Hay-on-Wye
 Knighton
 Lampeter
 Llandrindod Wells
 Llandysul
 Llanidloes
 Llanwrtyd
 Machynlleth
 Montgomery
 New Quay
 Newcastle Emlyn
 Newtown
 Rhayader
 Tregaron
 Tywyn
 Welshpool
 Ystradgynlais

Railway lines

Main lines
 Heart of Wales line
 Cambrian Line
 Welsh Marches line

Heritage lines
 Talyllyn Railway
 Welshpool & Llanfair Light Railway
 Vale of Rheidol Railway
 Cambrian Heritage Railways
 Brecon Mountain Railway
 Fairbourne Railway
 Corris Railway

Politics 
Parliamentary constituencies in Mid Wales include; Brecon and Radnorshire, Ceredigion, Dwyfor Meirionnydd and Montgomeryshire.

The region is represented in the Senedd with an electoral region known as Mid and West Wales.

Mid Wales Growth Deal 

On 13 January 2022, the Mid Wales Growth Deal's Final Deal Agreement was signed between the Growing Mid Wales Board; containing representatives from Ceredigion County Council and Powys County Council, and the UK and Welsh Governments. The deal involves the commitment of £110 million of funding from the two governments, with additional funding provided by other public and private sectors over the span of 10 years. The deal aims to increase investment in the region to £400 million by 2032, support an increase in gross value added of between £570 million and £700 million in the region's economy, and create between 1,100 to 1,400 jobs in Mid Wales.

See also
 Breconshire
 Geography of Wales
 Geology of Wales
 Mid Wales Football League
 Montgomery, Powys
 Montgomeryshire
 North Wales
 Radnorshire
 South Wales
 West Wales

References

External links

Growing Mid Wales

The BBC's Mid Wales page
 Overview of Mid Wales by the Welsh Development Agency
Mid Wales Region on Wales.com

Regions of Wales
Economic regions of Wales